The Battle of Gadebusch or Wakenstädt (20 December 1712) was Sweden's final great victory in the Great Northern War. It was fought by the Swedes to prevent the loss of the city of Stralsund to Danish and Saxon forces.

Prelude 

During 1712, all of Sweden's dominions south of the Baltic Sea, apart from forts, had been conquered by the allies Denmark, Saxony, and Russia. In the Baltic the Danish admiral Gyldenløve patrolled with a squadron to disrupt Swedish supply lines to the Continent. It was vital for Sweden not to lose Stralsund, as it was the gateway to campaigns in Poland.

While a Danish army moved in the region of Hamburg, a large Russian-Saxon force stood south of Stralsund. Stenbock could hardly attack this force with a frontal assault, but hoped that by moving west towards Mecklenburg it could be encircled or scattered. Such a movement would also prevent the joining of the two allied forces. The Danish army under Frederick IV of Denmark was led by general Jobst von Scholten closer to the Russian-Saxon army, and on 3 December the Danish forces reached the little town of Gadebusch, southwest of Wismar. The allied movements were slowed due to disagreements among the allied commanders. On 8 December he marched the Swedish army to Gross Brütz less than ten kilometers east of Gadebusch. Now the Russian infantry was too far away to assist the Danes, but the Saxon cavalry under Jacob Heinrich von Flemming was approaching quickly.

That night the Danish forces broke camp and moved to a better position around the village of Wakenstädt, three kilometers south of and today incorporated by Gadebusch. Scholten expected the Swedish attack to come from the south to avoid the marshy Radegast river. At four in the morning of 9 December the Danish army was arrayed in defensive formation, with cavalry wings flanking the infantry in the center. As hours passed, snowfall turned to rain. Finally, the Saxon cavalry under Flemming arrived at Wakenstädt at mid-morning.

Swedish reconnaissance made it clear that the only Swedish option was a frontal assault. Stenbock judged that although the passable terrain was narrow and his men somewhat outnumbered, the thirty Swedish field guns would provide an advantage over the Danish thirteen.

Battle 

The Swedish onslaught from the east began around 11 a.m. Swedish artillery opened fire on the tightly grouped Danish battalions and provided cover for the deploying cavalry and infantry. Stenbock held a short speech to his battleready army:

"” (Now you see your enemies before you, do you wish to get at them and show your love for your king and Fatherland?) the answers from the army was a resounding  (Yes!).

At 1 p.m. the order to attack was given. While the artillery kept firing, the infantry marched towards the Danes, not firing until reaching a distance of twelve paces. During this time, the Danish opponent remained relatively passive although firing several long range volleys with little effect. A Danish cavalry counterattack was broken by the infantry, supported by the constant artillery fire.

To the north, the Swedish cavalry made a flanking movement and surprised the Danish cavalry on the Danish left wing. The subsequent retreat into Wakenstädt caused confusion in the Danish ranks, which was exploited by the infantry on the Swedish right wing. Meanwhile, heavy fighting was taking place on the Danish right wing where the elite of the Danish army, the royal guard, was positioned supported by the main bulk of the Saxon cavalry. But despite the numerical superiority of the allies, attacks by the Saxon cavalry were repelled. The two Danish guard regiments fought a hard pressed melee battle with the Swedish Dalarna Regiment and Hälsinge Regiment. The fight was eventually won by the Swedes when the Danes realized that cavalry support would not come (the cavalry was engaged with the Swedish cavalry during the whole fight) while they were slowly pushed back by the Swedish infantry onslaught. Eventually the order for retreat came and the guard regiments withdrew in quite good order but with big losses, the Swedes were tired and had also taken considerable losses from the battle and could not make any determined pursuits.

The battle wound down by dusk: Danish and Saxon forces withdrew more or less orderly to a position several kilometers west of Gadebusch to regroup. All of the Danish artillery had been abandoned.

Aftermath 

After the battle Stenbock was promoted to Field Marshal by an approving King Charles. The battle was won by efficient use of artillery combined with determined flanking attacks by infantry and cavalry, and it gave the hard-pressed Swedish forces some well needed breathing room.

Stenbock who had earlier fought in the Nine Years' War, later pronounced:"Never have I seen such a combination of uncontrollable dash and perfectly controlled discipline, such soldiers and such subjects are not to be found the wide world over except in Sweden." About his Swedish troops that fought and died in this masterpiece-tactical victory in the battle of Gadebusch. Even from the other side, Maurice of Saxony claimed the Swedish bravery at Gadebusch to have been absolutely astounding.

Strategically, however, there was little impact, and the allies with their overwhelming numerical  superiority would surround and defeat Stenbock's forces after a siege in the fortress of Tönningen the next year.

References

 Svenska Slagfält, 2003, (Walhlström & Widstrand) 

Gadebusch
Gadebusch
Gadebusch
Gadebusch
1712 in Denmark
Gadebusch